See also Manoharpura

Parasiya, is a small village in Tonk District. 
The village is situated near the 1 km from Lamba village,4 km from Mehandwas village and 16 km from Tonk city of Rajasthan, India.

The village has population about 800 and most from Jat community. Almost 97% people earn their lives from Agriculture.

References

Villages in Tonk district